Bangladeshis form one of the largest immigrant populations in Italy. As of 2017, an "educated guess made by government officials of Bangladesh" was that there were 400,000 Bangladeshis living in Italy. In 2019, the Italian Ministry of Labour and Social Policies put the number of Bangladeshis regularly residing in Italy at 145,707.

History 
Bangladeshis first started immigrating to Italy in the 1980s. Many were skilled graduates attracted by career opportunities in industrial Northern Italy. Between late 1989 and mid-1990 the 200–300 Bangladeshis living in Rome increased by an estimated twenty-fold to become the largest Bangladeshi community in continental Europe. Subsequently, the population in Rome doubled in size, mainly through undocumented migration, to an estimated 10,000 people as of 1995. There are also a significant number of Bangladeshis in Sicily.

From 2012, over 20,000 Italian Bangladeshis migrated to the United Kingdom with the advent of Italy's manufacturing decline. The majority of them settled within the British Bangladeshi community in Banglatown, East London.

2019 marked the release of Italian blockbuster Bangla, which won awards for two consecutive years since its release. The film displayed the current situation of Bangladeshis in Italy, revolving around the life of a boy whose family plan to migrate to London.

Demography 
Most of the Bangladeshis in Italy hail from the districts of Sylhet , Comilla, Dhaka, Faridpur, and Noakhali. 71.6% of them are male. 59% of the Bangladeshi population (15 years and older) is employed – a figure two percentage points higher than that recorded for the non-EU nationals in the country. The Bangladeshi community in Italy has an unemployment rate of 11%, slightly lower than the whole of non-EU nationals.  The service sector absorbs over 70% of the workers belonging to the community. The percentage of Bangladeshis employed in industry is 22%. About 33% of Bangladeshis employed earn a monthly income below €800. Preponderant is the income class between €800 and €1,200, accounting for 48% of the community's employed.

Notable Italian-Bangladeshis 
Phaim Bhuiyan, film director and actor

References 

Bangladeshi diaspora
Immigration to Italy
Bangladesh–Italy relations